The 1990 All-Ireland Under-21 Hurling Championship was the 27th staging of the All-Ireland Under-21 Hurling Championship since its establishment by the Gaelic Athletic Association in 1964. The championship began on 6 June 1990 ended on 9 September 1990.

Tipperary entered the championship as the defending champions.

On 9 September 1990, Kilkenny won the championship after a 2-11 to 1-11 defeat of Tipperary in the All-Ireland final. This was their fifth All-Ireland title overall and their first title since 1985.

Kilkenny's Jamesie Brennan was the championship's top scorer with 0-25.

Results

Leinster Under-21 Hurling Championship

First round

Semi-finals

Final

Munster Under-21 Hurling Championship

Quarter-final

Semi-finals

Final

Ulster Under-21 Hurling Championship

Final

All-Ireland Under-21 Hurling Championship

Semi-finals

Final

Championship statistics

Top scorers

Overall

References

Under
All-Ireland Under-21 Hurling Championship